This is a list of typical  dishes found in Korean cuisine.

Main dishes
 ,, made with multiple grains
 ,, noodles made with fish
 ,, noodle dish made with buckwheat
 ,, made with buckwheat
 ,, mandu (dumpling) made with a buckwheat covering
 ,, made with tteok (rice cakes)

Porridge

 ,, thick porridge made with buckwheat and other grains
 ,, porridge made with seafood
 ,, porridge made with abalone
 ,, porridge made with tilefish
 ,, porridge made with crabs
 ,, porridge made with shiitake
 ,, porridge made with chicken
 ,, porridge made with young wakame
 ,, porridge made with buckwheat Omphalius rusticus

Challyu
 ,, made with fernbrake
 ,
 Pork ,, spicy soup made with pork
 ,,  made with fermented soybean paste
 ,
 ,
 ,
 ,
 ,

Grilled dishes

 ,, grilled Tilefish
 ,, made with pork
 ,
 ,, made with dried shark fillet

Pancakes
 ,, made with shark
 ,, made with eggs
 ,
 , or called , made with shiitake
 ,, made with pheasant meat
 ,
 ,, made with pheasant meat

Pickles
 ,, pickle made with pepper leaves
 ,, pickle made with green chili pepper and cucumber in soy sauce

Raw dishes

 ,), made with damselfish
 ,, made with damselfish
 ,
 ,
 ,
 ,, sliced raw squid made with squid
 ,
 ,

Sauteed vegetables
 ,
 ,

Wraps
 ,
 ,
 ,

Kimchi
 ,
 ,
 ,
 ,

Dried dishes
 ,
 ,
 ,
 ,
 ,

Tteok

 ,,  made with buckwheat
 ,
 , (literally "moon "),  made by pounding rice and shaped into a circle like a full moon. It is also a local specialty of Hamgyong province.
 ,, made with rice
  or called ,
 ,, made with Italian millet
 ,,  made with Italian millet and shaped into a ring
 ,, made with Italian millet flour or buckwheat flour.
 ,,  made by pounding rice and boiled  (Artemisia princeps var. orientalis).
 ,, made by pan-frying pieces of dough made with buckwheat and stuffed with a sweeten filling.
  or called ,,  made with powder of dried sweet potato and shaped like 

Desserts
 ,,  (candy) made with glutinous millet and chicken
 ,,  made with glutinous millet and pheasant meat
 ,,  made with glutinous millet and pork
 ,,  made with glutinous millet and Trichosanthes kirilowii
 ,,  made with pumpkin
 ,,  made with barley
 ,,  made with glutinous millet and garlic

Non-alcoholic beverages

 ,,  (punch) made with Mandarin orange
 ,, made with dried leaves of Albizia julibrissin
 ,, made with dried Limnophila aromatica

See also
Korean cuisine
Korean royal court cuisine
Korean temple cuisine
List of Korean dishes

References

External links
Official site of Korea National Tourism List of Korean Food 
Food in Korea at the Korea Agro-Fisheries Trade Corporation
한국의 떡  uriculture.com

 
Jeju
Jeju Province